Shield is a surname.  Notable people with this surname include:

 George Shield (1876–1935), British Labour Party politician
 Hugh Shield (1831–1903), English academic, barrister and Liberal Party politician who sat in the House of Commons from 1880 to 1885
 Ian Shield (1914–2005), English cricketer
 Jeff Shield (1953–2009), Australian professional rugby league player
 Joe Shield, former quarterback in the National Football League
 Leroy Shield (1893–1962), American film score and radio composer
 Little Shield (died 1879), chieftain of the Northern Cheyenne from 1865 to 1879
 Mark Shield (born 1973), former Australian Football referee
 Pretty Shield (1856–1944), medicine woman of the Crow Nation
 William Shield (1748–1829), English composer, violinist and violist

See also
 Shields (surname)